The United Rubber, Cork, Linoleum and Plastic Workers of America (URW) was a labor union representing workers involved in manufacturing using specific materials, in the United States and Canada.

The union was founded in 1935 as the United Rubber Workers of America, and was chartered by the American Federation of Labor (AFL) on September 12. It aligned itself with the Congress of Industrial Organizations (CIO), and as a result, was suspended by the AFL in 1936 and expelled in 1938. In 1937, it was chartered by the CIO, and by 1953, it had grown to become the federation's sixth-largest affiliate, with 190,000 members.

In 1955, the URW affiliated to the new AFL–CIO, and by 1980, its membership had increased slightly, to 199,990. On July 2, 1995, it merged into the United Steelworkers of America.

Presidents
1935: Sherman Dalrymple
1945: L. S. Buckmaster
1960: George Burdon
1966: Peter Bommarito
1981: Mike Stone
1990: Kenneth L. Coss

References

Plastics and rubber trade unions
Trade unions established in 1935
Trade unions disestablished in 1980